Mount Lolo,  1748m (5735'), prominence 818m, is a summit 20 km northeast of Kamloops, British Columbia, Canada, between Paul and Heffley Lakes.  The summit is part of a small portion of the Interior Plateau which lies within the angle of the confluence of the South and North Thompson Rivers, to the east of which is an upland area known as the Shuswap Highland.

Name origin
Mount Lolo is named for Jean Baptiste Lolo, also known as Chief Lolo or Chief St. Paul, an Iroquois-French Canadian Métis who served in the employ of the Hudson's Bay Company as an interpreter and right-hand man to Chief Trader John Tod at Fort Fraser and Fort Kamloops.  He became regarded as a chief by the local Secwepemc people.

See also
 Harper Mountain
 Mount Tod
 Sun Peaks
 Paul Lake Provincial Park

References
 
 

Interior Plateau
Kamloops
Lolo
Kamloops Division Yale Land District